Life of Agony is an American alternative metal band from Brooklyn, New York City, formed in 1989 by singer Mina Caputo (then known as Keith Caputo), bassist Alan Robert and guitarist Joey Z. The band has released six studio albums to date, most notably their 1993 debut River Runs Red, named by Rolling Stone as one of the Greatest Metal Albums of All Time.

History

Formation and River Runs Red (1989–1994)
The band was formed in the summer of 1989 by singer Mina Caputo, bassist Alan Robert, and guitarist Joey Z. The group recorded a handful of demos produced by Josh Silver of Type O Negative, using a number of different drummers. LOA performed up and down the East Coast developing a loyal fan base and eventually signed to Roadrunner Records in 1993 to release their debut album River Runs Red. Drummer Mike Palmeri exited the band shortly after signing to the label, so the group recruited Type O Negative drummer Sal Abruscato to take over the recording. The following year, Life of Agony continued to build a following, and toured with the likes of Carcass, Pro-Pain, God Lives Underwater, KMFDM, Korn, and more.

Music videos and promotional singles would be released for the songs "This Time" and "Through and Through". The music video for "This Time" would be featured in an episode of Beavis and Butt-Head, while both videos would find occasional airplay on Headbangers Ball, which gave the band early exposure.

Ugly (1995–1996)

River Runs Red was followed by the more emotional Ugly album in 1995. It was produced by Steve Thompson, who would become a Grammy winner in later years. The album peaked at No. 153 on the Billboard 200, the band's first appearance on a Billboard chart. "Lost At 22" and "Let's Pretend" were both released as singles, but did not chart.

While touring in 1995 in support of their album, a fan died after falling from the stage while apparently trying to stage-dive. A security guard and, to a lesser extent, the band were implicated in a lawsuit which was eventually dropped with no charges filed. At subsequent concerts the band were mindful of the potential for fans to injure themselves, often trying to cool down the mosh pit between songs if things were rough. An example of this would be seen on the River Runs Again DVD, in which Caputo is heard saying "Everybody watch over each other out in the pit, we already lost a life." and "No lives lost, right?"

Drummer Abruscato left Life of Agony after the accompanying tour. His successor was ex-Pro-Pain and ex-Crumbsuckers drummer Dan Richardson.

Soul Searching Sun, Caputo's departure, and breakup (1997–2002)
Life of Agony released their third album Soul Searching Sun in September 1997. It marked a slight change of style for the band. The album charted at No. 157 on the Billboard 200, slightly lower than the band's previous effort; however, the lead single "Weeds" peaked at No. 27 on the Billboard Mainstream Rock chart, and lingered on the chart for over 3 months. The second single, "Tangerine", would peak at No. 37 on the same chart.

Despite the growing success of "Weeds" and the band's mainstream attention, Caputo departed the band shortly after the release of Soul Searching Sun in September 1997. Caputo was struggling with internalised gender dysphoria and was becoming disillusioned with the masculine image of herself she was faking at the time. "What good is my success if I can't even enjoy my fucking soul and my body?' I wanted to come out then, but failed miserably and didn't have the courage or the knowhow. I didn't know what to do." Caputo decided to distance herself from the band completely; "It took me to quit the band because I wasn't being true to myself. I had to get away from my band, the label, everyone I worked with." At the time, the band did not understand Caputo's reasons for wanting to quit the band, with Alan Robert saying, "She just [told the band] she was in too much pain to continue."

The band then toured with ex-Ugly Kid Joe singer Whitfield Crane, went back into the studio, and kicked Crane out of the band in the span of one year. They contemplated moving Robert to vocals and guitar and adding former Stuck Mojo bassist Corey Lowery, but decided they did not want to continue under the Life of Agony banner without Caputo; thus, they decided to split in 1999. Robert started Among Thieves with former members of Biohazard and the rest of the band started Stereomud with Erik Rogers on vocals, both not straying far from Life of Agony's style. A live CD with the band's unplugged performance at the Dutch Lowlands Festival from 1997 was released in 2000.

First reunion and Broken Valley (2003–2011)
On January 3 and 4, 2003, the original lineup reunited for two sold-out shows at New York's Irving Plaza. Both shows were recorded and released on CD/DVD later that same year. The reunion resulted in several more shows and appearances on European festivals, as well as the recording of 2005's Broken Valley, the band's first new studio album since 1997 and their first on the Sony-owned Epic Records. The original album contained a controversial copy protection method that would later be seen in court. Broken Valley was a commercial disappointment for Epic despite reaching No. 147 on the Billboard 200, the band's highest position yet. The album's lead single, "Love to Let You Down", peaked at No. 25 on the Billboard Mainstream Rock chart. At the end of 2005, the label and the band parted ways.

Caputo later stated "That experience killed this band in a lot of ways. The label didn't understand who this band was and continually tried to mold us into something we weren't. Not to mention the illegal spyware they put on our album without our knowledge to try and prevent piracy, and the class-action lawsuit they lost because of it. The court forced them to pull all of our records off the shelf just three months after it was released! The whole thing was a nightmare. We didn't want to make new music for a long time after that."

Life of Agony went on to tour with Megadeth, Dream Theater, and numerous other metal bands during 2005's Gigantour. Three years after their tour in 2005, Life of Agony released a CD/DVD set for River Runs Red with bonus tracks and videos from their early career. Caputo was featured on the 2007 track "What Have You Done" from the band Within Temptation. The song had been a minor hit all around the world.

During a December 2010 appearance on MTV's Headbangers Ball, Life of Agony announced they were writing new material. Abruscato stated in the interview that they were "Going to start with one song and see if there is a good enough spark to continue writing. This is something special for the fans for their patience."

By the summer of 2011, the band attempted to write new material, only to feel it was being forced and not natural. In between, Abruscato created A Pale Horse Named Death, Joey Z. was still running his New York-based Method of Groove Studio, Caputo would focus on various solo projects, and Robert was working on his second comic for IDW and a film of his first comic called Wire Hangers.

Second split (2012–2013)
In a February 2012 interview, Abruscato confirmed that Life of Agony was disbanded. He explained "We're not gonna play [anymore]. We moved out of our studio. We all kind of feel like we're at the end. We're never gonna make another record, because of those kinds of problems I was talking about [earlier in the interview] – we can't agree on writing a song. And Mina Caputo (vocals) wants to pursue her lifestyle. And that's pretty much the reason why also I've moved on and I'm doing my own thing...to just keep going; I didn't want my career to stop with Life of Agony. Life of Agony doesn't tour, Life of Agony doesn't do much. And so we were at a point where it was like...we did the last three shows in July [2011] and then we moved out of our studio, and that's it. I don't foresee anything in the future; I highly doubt it. I don't know how that would happen."

In a July 2012 interview with Revolver Magazine, Robert described his attitude towards the state of the band, and said "I actually don't think Mina's transition is the ultimate reason the band isn't active right now. We'd been doing a lot less touring over the last bunch of years, way before she announced her personal news. I can only speak for myself, but I can say that starting a family has definitely made me want to tour and travel a lot less in general. For that reason in particular, I'm much happier being home working on my comics and film projects. It fulfills my creative needs and allows me to live the life I want to at this stage."

Second reunion (2014–present)

On March 22, 2014, Life of Agony confirmed on their official website that they were active again, and performed their first show since Caputo's gender confirmation at the Alcatraz Hard Rock & Metal Festival in Kortrijk, Belgium on August 8.

On January 12, 2016, Life of Agony announced that they were signed to Napalm Records, and released A Place Where There's No More Pain, their first studio album in 12 years, on April 28, 2017. In December of that same year, drummer Abruscato would leave the band for the second time, and was replaced by Veronica Bellino. While no official reason has been disclosed, Mina Caputo has accused Abruscato of transphobia and gaslighting as the reason he was kicked out, though he has disputed these claims.

The band announced the release, in October 2019, of its sixth studio album The Sound of Scars on Napalm Records again, which was being billed as "Chapter Two" to their debut River Runs Red. The concept album, hailed by Loudwire as one of the year's "Most Anticipated Hard Rock & Metal Albums" was produced and mixed by Grammy Award-winning producer Sylvia Massy and co-produced by the band's guitarist Joey Z, while engineer Howie Weinberg handled mastering duties.

On August 9, 2019, the lead single "Scars" premiered on Billboard. The Sound of Scars would ultimately peak at No. 3 on Billboard's Heatseekers Albums and No. 7 on Billboard's Independent Albums. The album received critical acclaim and was named Album of the Year by The Aquarian.

A documentary film, also titled The Sound of Scars, is set to be released by Cinedigm in association with Raven Banner Entertainment in 2022. The film is directed by Leigh Brooks and will include interviews with the band members and their families. The film will also include archival footage, photographs, lost interviews, and go over various points of the band's history, including Mina Caputo's gender transition. A portion of ticket sales from the film's Director's Cut Screening  were donated to the National Suicide Prevention Lifeline and All Out.

A documentary chronicling the relationships within the band, titled The Sound of Scars, is set to be released by Cinedigm in association with Raven Banner Entertainment in March 2022. The film was featured by The British Film Institute's BFI Flare Festival.

As of December 2022, Life of Agony has begun working on new material for the follow-up to The Sound of Scars. The band will also celebrate the 30th anniversary of their first album River Runs Red in 2023 with a world tour.

Musical style and influences
Life of Agony has mostly been described as alternative metal, but also as grunge, hard rock, heavy metal and nu metal, and has incorporated elements of hardcore punk into its sound. Rivers Run Red was an alternative metal album with influences from grunge and New York hardcore. Starting with Soul Searching Sun, the band moved to an alternative rock-oriented style.

According to the group members themselves, they were influenced by bands such as Radiohead, Metallica, Pink Floyd, Led Zeppelin, Black Sabbath, and Social Distortion.
Robert wrote the majority of the music and lyrics and Caputo wrote select ballads, mostly about her parents and homelife, particularly her mother.

Perhaps the most striking difference between the River Runs Red and Ugly albums of the mid-90s and 2005's Broken Valley is the change in Caputo's vocal style, which gradually changed from a Danzig-esque baritone to a lighter, more conventional rock style later in the band's career.

Side projects 
The band continues to perform and make music together as well as pursuing individual projects. Caputo recorded several solo records with European musicians and has toured overseas to support those albums.

Robert, Life of Agony's primary songwriter, started Spoiler NYC in 2006. The group recorded an album called Grease Fire in Hell's Kitchen and filmed videos for the singles "Suicide Hotel" and "Ruined". Many reviewers praised the old-school approach to their street punk sound. He later established himself as a horror comics author and illustrator, releasing several critically acclaimed series for IDW Publishing. His creator-owned titles include Wire Hangers, Crawl to Me and Killogy. His horror-themed adult coloring book series The Beauty of Horror has a worldwide following and the title is currently being developed into an animated television series.

Joey Z. created his own recording studio, Method of Groove, in Brooklyn, New York City, which was opened in February 2011; the studio and its equipment were completely destroyed during Hurricane Sandy in October 2012.

Band members 

Current members
 Mina Caputo – lead vocals (1989–1997, 2002–2012, 2014–present)
 Alan Robert – bass guitar (1989–1999, 2002–2012, 2014–present)
 Joey Z – guitars (1989–1999, 2002–2012, 2014–present)
 Veronica Bellino – drums (2018–present)

Former members
 Sal Abruscato – drums (1993–1996, 2002–2012, 2014–2017)
 Dan Richardson – drums (1996–1999)
 Whitfield Crane – lead vocals (1997–1999)
 Eric Chan – drums (1989–1990)
 Mike Palmeri – drums (1992–1993)
 Kenny Pedersen – drums (1990–1992)

Timeline

Discography

 River Runs Red (1993)
 Ugly (1995)
 Soul Searching Sun (1997)
 Broken Valley (2005)
 A Place Where There's No More Pain (2017)
 The Sound of Scars (2019)

References

External links

 
 Interview with Dan Nelson and Joey Z

Heavy metal musical groups from New York (state)
Musical groups from Brooklyn
Musical groups established in 1989
Musical groups disestablished in 1999
Musical groups reestablished in 2002
Musical groups disestablished in 2012
Musical groups reestablished in 2014
Roadrunner Records artists
American alternative metal musical groups
Musical quartets
1989 establishments in New York City